Venets Transmitter (Bulgarian: РРТС Венец) is a facility for FM and TV-broadcasting near Venets and Samuil in Shumen Province, Bulgaria. Venets Transmitter uses as antenna tower a 302 metre tall guyed lattice steel mast with rectangular cross section. This mast, which was built in 1975, is the tallest radio mast in Bulgaria. The TV transmitter, which used it as antenna, was the most powerful TV transmitter in Bulgaria with 50 kW. It broadcast the program of BNT 1 on channel 5 and could be received in Romania, Moldova and Ukraine. In 2008 due to interference with foreign FM radio stations the transmitter was shut down and broadcasting of BNT 1 was switched to channel 56 on a new NEC transmitter. The analogue transmitters were shut down on September 30, 2015, when simulcast period ended and Bulgaria switched to DVB-T.

Beside this, Venets is used for FM-broadcasting with three 10 kW NEC transmitters. Until 2007 the transmitter broadcast the Turkish language program of the Bulgarian National Radio in the OIRT-band on frequency 69,80 MHz.

The current transmission frequencies are:

External links
 http://predavatel.com/bg/6/shu.htm#venets
 
 http://skyscraperpage.com/diagrams/?b46687

Towers in Bulgaria
Radio masts and towers in Europe
Towers completed in 1975
Buildings and structures in Shumen Province
1975 establishments in Bulgaria